Christy's dormouse (Graphiurus christyi) is a species of rodent in the family Gliridae. It is found in Cameroon and Democratic Republic of the Congo. Its natural habitat is subtropical or tropical moist lowland forests.

References
 Grubb, P. & Schlitter, D. 2008.  Graphiurus christyi.   2006 IUCN Red List of Threatened Species.   Downloaded on 18 August 2009.
Holden, M. E.. 2005. Family Gliridae. pp. 819–841 in Mammal Species of the World a Taxonomic and Geographic Reference. D. E. Wilson and D. M. Reeder eds. Johns Hopkins University Press, Baltimore.

Graphiurus
Mammals described in 1914
Taxonomy articles created by Polbot